The Maribyrnong River Viaduct (also known locally as the Quarter Mile Bridge) carries the Albion–Jacana railway line, Melbourne across the Maribyrnong River in the western suburbs of Melbourne, Australia. It is located near the E J Whitten Bridge, and is almost 400 metres long (hence the Quarter Mile name).

It was built in 1927–29 by the Victorian Railways Construction Branch, being the largest trestle bridge in Australia when completed in June, 1929. Until the completion of the Sydney Harbour Bridge, the viaduct was also the highest railway bridge in Australia. It employed 200 people during its construction, with one fatality, and is listed on the Victorian Heritage Register.

The main traffic over the bridge is freight services, but it also carries two passenger services, the Melbourne to Sydney NSW TrainLink XPT, and the Melbourne-Albury V/Line service which now runs on standard gauge.

References

Notes 
 City of Moonee Valley Gap Heritage Study

External links 
 Images from the construction of the bridge, 1928

Bridges in Melbourne
Heritage-listed buildings in Melbourne
1929 establishments in Australia
Railway bridges in Victoria (Australia)
Bridges completed in 1929
Buildings and structures in the City of Brimbank
Buildings and structures in the City of Moonee Valley
Transport in the City of Moonee Valley
Maribyrnong River
Transport in the City of Brimbank